Old Flame may refer to:

TV
 Old Flame (Dexter's Laboratory), an episode of Dexter's Laboratory
 "An Old Flame", an episode of Upstairs, Downstairs
 "Old Flame", an episode of 8 Simple Rules
 "Old Flames", an episode of Screen Two

Music
 "Old Flame" (Alabama song), a country song by Alabama
 "Old Flame" (Johnny Reid song), a country song by Johnny Reid
 "Old Flame" (Poco song), a 1986 single by Juice Newton, originally recorded by Poco
 "Old Flame", a song by Arcade Fire from their self-titled EP
 Old Flame (Juice Newton album), a 1985 album by Juice Newton

See also
 "Old Flames Can't Hold a Candle to You", a country song popularized by several artists